The Rio Cinema is a purpose-built, two-screen, 280-seat cinema in Burnham on Crouch, Essex in the United Kingdom. The building dates from 1931. The Burnham Rio is one of the cheapest cinemas in the county.

External links 
Cinema Treasures: Rio Cinema

References

Cinemas in Essex
Burnham-on-Crouch